Neoalsomitra is a genus of flowering plants belonging to the Squash Family (Cucurbitaceae).

Its native range is Tropical and Subtropical Asia to Fiji.

Species
Species:

Neoalsomitra angustipetala 
Neoalsomitra balansae 
Neoalsomitra capricornica 
Neoalsomitra clavigera 
Neoalsomitra hederifolia 

Neoalsomitra pilosa 
Neoalsomitra plena 
Neoalsomitra sarcophylla 
Neoalsomitra schefferiana 
Neoalsomitra schultzei 
Neoalsomitra simplex 
Neoalsomitra trifoliolata

References

Cucurbitaceae
Cucurbitaceae genera